John Lodts (23 September 1916 – 16 February 1937) was a Belgian footballer. He played in one match for the Belgium national football team in 1936.

References

External links
 

1916 births
1937 deaths
Belgian footballers
Belgium international footballers
Place of birth missing
Association football midfielders